USS Beluga (SP-536) was a United States Navy patrol vessel in commission from 1917 to 1918.

Beluga was built in 1911 as a private motorboat Gaviota by the Greenport Basin & Construction Company at Greenport on Long Island, New York. She later was renamed Beluga.

On 14 May 1917, the U.S. Navy acquired Beluga under a free lease from her owner, Mr. J. Henry Herring of New Bedford, Massachusetts, for use as a section patrol vessel during World War I. She was commissioned as USS Beluga (SP-536) on 15 May 1917.

Assigned to the 2nd Naval District in southern New England, Beluga operated on patrol duties in the coastal waters around the section bases at Newport, Rhode Island, and New Bedford for the rest of World War I.

Beluga was stricken from the Navy Directory on 25 November 1918 and returned to Herring.

References

Department of the Navy Naval History and Heritage Command Online Library of Selected Images: Civilian Ships: Beluga (American Motor Boat, 1911). Formerly named Gaviota. Served as USS Beluga (SP-536) in 1917-1918
NavSource Online: Section Patrol Craft Photo Archive: Beluga (SP 536)

Patrol vessels of the United States Navy
World War I patrol vessels of the United States
Ships built in Greenport, New York
1911 ships